Variation on a Theme is a 1958 play by the British writer Terence Rattigan. It is a reworking of Alexandre Dumas, fils's nineteenth century novel and subsequent play La Dame aux Camélias.

Original production
Directed by John Gielgud, the play opened (after a pre-London tour), at the Globe Theatre, London, on 8 May 1958, with the following cast:
Hettie - Jean Anderson
Rose - Margaret Leighton
Ron - Jeremy Brett
Kurt - George Pravda
Fiona - Felicity Ross
Adrian - Lawrence Dalzell
Mona - Mavis Villiers
Sam - Michael Goodliffe

Reception
While not received well by the critics, the play ran for 132 performances. Kenneth Tynan wrote in The Observer:"As far as I could see the star of the show was Norman Hartnell, from whose contributions – a white diamanté sack, a shocking-pink cocktail dress in pleated chiffon, a casual ensemble of blouse and pedal-pushing slacks, and a two-tiered ball-gown in navy-blue pebble-crèpe – the lean extremities of Margaret Leighton nervously protuded ."

References

Bibliography
  David Pattie. Modern British Playwriting: The 1950s: Voices, Documents, New Interpretations. 2013.

1958 plays
Plays by Terence Rattigan
West End plays